Zeacolpus vittatus is a species of large sea snail, a marine gastropod mollusc in the family Turritellidae, the tower snails.

References

 Powell A. W. B., New Zealand Mollusca, William Collins Publishers Ltd, Auckland, New Zealand 1979 

Turritellidae
Gastropods of New Zealand
Gastropods described in 1873